Ridgway Brewster Knight (June 12, 1911 – August 14, 2001) was a French-born American diplomat who served as Ambassador to Syria (1961–1965), Belgium (1965–1969) and Portugal (1969–1973).

Early life and career
The son of American parents living in Paris (painter Louis Aston Knight and Caroline Ridgeway Brewster), he studied and graduated from Harvard Business School in 1931.

Following his studies, Knight began importing French wine to the US. He was vice consul in Casablanca, and in 1942 took part in organizing the US landing in Algeria.

Knight served as U.S. ambassador to several countries, and later served as president of the American Club of Paris (1984–1989). From 1973 to 1981, he worked for Chase Manhattan Bank .

Personal life and death
Knight married Christine Saint-Léger at Inxent on February 19, 1983. His grandson, Ridgway B. Knight 3rd, married Patricia Wachtell on May 30, 1987. He died in Inxent, at the age of 90.

References

Sources

"AMBASSADOR RIDGWAY B. KNIGHT", The Association for Diplomatic Studies and Training
The John F. Kennedy National Security Files, 1961–1963

1911 births
2001 deaths
People from New York (state)
Harvard Business School alumni
Ambassadors of the United States to Belgium
Ambassadors of the United States to Portugal
Ambassadors of the United States to Syria
American expatriates in France